A Night Under the Dam is Green Carnation's second live DVD, released under the Sublife Productions label on 1 February 2007.

The DVD contains the entire live show, including two bonus songs, a photo gallery containing more than one-hundred-seventy images, a behind-the-scenes video and full 5.1 Surround Sound.

Background 
This live recording was made several kilometers into the Norwegian southern mountains, under the thirty-meter-tall dam Nåvatn-3 built in 1939 -hence the album name-, by the lake Nåvatnet in the municipality of Åseral.

The band performed its entire The Acoustic Verses album and other material in front of an audience of more than five hundred. Green Carnation was supported by several guests, including the Kristiansand String Quartet, singer Anne Marie Almedal, and violinist Leif A. Wiese.

Contents
Concert
"Child's Play (Part III)" – 4:32
"Sweet Leaf" – 4:59
"9-29-045 (Part I, II and III)" – 15:50
"Alone" – 3:56
"Maybe?" – 3:29
"High Tide Waves" – 8:21
"Transparent Me" – 5:16
"Six Ribbons" – 3:52
"The Burden Is Mine... Alone" – 7:57
Behind-the-scenes documentary video
Extensive photo gallery

Personnel

Band members
 Terje Vik Schei (a.k.a. Tchort) – guitar, lyrics
 Stein Roger Sordal – bass guitar, vocals, guitar, lyrics
 Kjetil Nordhus – vocals, lyrics
 Kenneth Silden – piano, keyboards
 Michael Krumins – guitar, theremin
 Tommy Jacksonville – drums

Guest musicians
 Bjørn Harstad – guitar
 Anne Marie Almedal – vocals
 Leif A. Wiese – violin
 Kristiansand string quartet

References

External links
 The official Green Carnation website
 Live album info @ Underthedam.com

Green Carnation albums
2007 video albums
Live video albums
2007 live albums